Austintown Fitch High School is a public high school in Austintown, Ohio, United States.  It is the only high school in the Austintown Local School District. Athletic teams compete as the Austintown Fitch Falcons in the Ohio High School Athletic Association as a member of the All-American Conference.

The original structure was located at 5680 Mahoning Ave. Classes moved to the new high school in 1968. The original structure has been demolished.

Sports

OHSAA State Championships

 Boys Basketball – 1931
 Boys Cross Country – 1971, 1972, 1975,

Bowling State Championships
 Boys Bowling – 2002, 2003
 Girls Bowling – 2003

Notable alumni
 Irv Holdash – '47, first-team All-American center and linebacker in 1950
 Donna Roberts – '62, convicted of the murder of her ex-husband
 Phil Keaggy – '70, Grammy Award-nominated guitarist
 Mike Calhoun – '75, former NFL and CFL defensive lineman
 Mike Trgovac – '77, Green Bay Packers defensive line coach
 Wally Bell – '83, MLB umpire
 Jeff Wilkins – '90, retired St. Louis Rams  NFL placekicker
 Mike McGlynn – '03, Indianapolis Colts offensive guard
 Billy Price - '13, Center for the New York Giants

Notes and references
 Leo Hawkins Hof and national champion Youngstown state university (running back)1991

External links
 District website

High schools in Mahoning County, Ohio
Public high schools in Ohio
1968 establishments in Ohio
Educational institutions established in 1968